Sheffield City Council elections took place on Thursday 7 May 2015, the same day as the UK general election and local Parish Council elections. There were 28 seats up for election, one of the three councillors from each ward.

Election result
Source.

This result had the following consequences for the total number of seats on the Council after the elections:

Ward results

Arbourthorne

Beauchief & Greenhill

Beighton

Birley

Broomhill

Burngreave

Central

Crookes

Darnall

Dore & Totley

East Ecclesfield

Ecclesall

Firth Park

Fulwood

Gleadless Valley

Graves Park

Hillsborough

Manor Castle

Mosborough

Nether Edge

Richmond

Shiregreen & Brightside

Southey

Stannington

Stocksbridge & Upper Don

Walkley

West Ecclesfield

Woodhouse

References

2015 English local elections
May 2015 events in the United Kingdom
2015
2010s in Sheffield